Giuseppe Rosetti (17 April 1899 – 12 June 1965) was an Italian footballer and manager who played as a midfielder.

He was commonly known as Rosetti I to distinguish him from his brother Gino, also a footballer.

References

1899 births
1965 deaths
Serie A players
Spezia Calcio players
Mantova 1911 players
Audax Italiano footballers
Colo-Colo footballers
Torino F.C. players
Chile national football team managers
Colo-Colo managers
Spezia Calcio managers
Association football midfielders
Italian footballers
Italian football managers
Italian expatriate footballers
Expatriate footballers in Chile
Italian expatriate football managers
Expatriate football managers in Chile
Naturalized citizens of Chile